Vahiniidae is a family of cyclopoid copepods in the order Cyclopoida. There are at least two genera and two described species in Vahiniidae.

Genera
These two genera belong to the family Vahiniidae:
 Vahinia
 Vahinius Humes, 1967

References

Cyclopoida
Articles created by Qbugbot
Crustacean families